Madden NFL 99 is a football video game released for the PlayStation, Nintendo 64 and Microsoft Windows. It is the first multiplatform Madden game to be fully 3D  and polygonally based (and the second one following the N64-exclusive, Madden Football 64) and is also the first game to feature Franchise mode. The game's commentary is by John Madden and Pat Summerall. The American version of the game features John Madden himself on the cover, while the European version uses Garrison Hearst instead. The game was the top-selling PlayStation sports video game in 1998 in North America, having sold 1.1 million copies on the PlayStation.

Gameplay

Features 
 The game is the first to feature the concept of covering the ball while running and the chop block and "clothesline" techniques, which were later scrapped and moved to players simply tackling ball-carriers. Although players' heights resemble their real-life counterparts, all players share the same sized physiques. The game includes twelve historic teams, including the 1978 Steelers and 1985 Bears and secret teams such as the Tiburon sports team and NFL All-Star teams from each decade. The Cleveland Browns, who were a year away from rejoining the league, can be accessed for exhibition games via the password "WELCOMEBACK".
 This is the first Madden game to feature Franchise Mode, in which the user can control their team for 15 seasons, complete with realistic NFL type schedules consisting of alternating inter-conference divisional opponents. The user is able to trade, sign/release and draft players. Drawbacks to this feature include only one player/team owner being allowed to participate during the same franchised season, and the second prohibits any created players from being added to specific teams or to the free agent pool.
 This is one of the few PlayStation games to support two multi-taps allowing for up to eight players to play simultaneously.

Free agents 
 Created Players from NCAA Football 99 can be put in the game as free agents and put on other teams in Quick Game Mode.
 Gary Zimmerman appears as a free agent despite being retired at the beginning of the season.
 Pepper Johnson is listed incorrectly as a 24-year-old twelve-year veteran, which would mean he would have been a 12-year-old rookie.

Rankings 
The Denver Broncos has the best team overall in the game with a score of 92. The worst teams in the game are the New York Jets and the Miami Dolphins with a score of 70. The best offense in the game belongs to the Green Bay Packers with a score of 95. The best defense in the game belongs to the San Francisco 49ers with a score of 97. The best special teams in the game belongs to the New England Patriots with a perfect score of 100.

Development
In early 1998 Electronic Arts announced that, following the 1997 Madden Football 64s lack of an NFL team license due to Acclaim Entertainment holding exclusive rights to NFL games on the Nintendo 64 for that year, they had ensured that the Nintendo 64 version of Madden NFL 99 would sport the NFL license.

Reception 

The game received "favorable" reviews on all platforms according to video game review aggregator GameRankings. Next Generation, however, said of the PlayStation version, "It can be argued that this year's Madden was better than last year's, but the fact remains that compared to its main competitor, the gaming experience has become mediocre. The gap that had existed between the GameDay series and the Madden series can now only be described as Grand Canyon size."

Kevin Cheung of Hyper gave the PlayStation version 82% in its December 1998 issue, calling it "the best NFL sim anywhere." An issue later, Matt Adamsons gave the PC version 85%, calling it "the best NFL simulation money could buy." Martin Kitts of N64 Magazine gave the N64 version 88%, saying, "Madden is still great stuff, but it hasn't really changed significantly enough to warrant another 92% rating." Steve Bauman of Computer Games Strategy Plus gave the PC version four stars out of five, saying, "The perfect synergy of hardcore action and cerebral simulation hasn't been reached yet, but Madden 99 is as close as anyone has ever managed to get, and as its management features evolve, it will no longer be, 'I guess we'll have to wait until next year.' Now it's more like 'I can't wait until next year.'"

Notes

References

External links
 

1998 video games
Madden NFL
Electronic Arts games
Nintendo 64 games
PlayStation (console) games
Windows games
EA Sports games
Video games developed in the United States